

Cordoba University is a defunct Islamic university formerly located in Ashburn, Virginia, United States.  The university was made up of the Graduate School of Islamic and Social Sciences (GSISS) and Cordoba School of Professional Studies.  GSISS was part of a United States Department of Defense program for training Muslim military chaplains which produced the United States Marine Corps' first Muslim chaplain. 

GSISS is an affiliate member of the Washington Theological Consortium.

References 

 At a Hartford Seminary, a Military Matter by Tim Townsend, The New York Times, October 12, 2003

External links 
 Cordoba University

Education in Loudoun County, Virginia
Seminaries and theological colleges in Virginia
Islamic universities and colleges in the United States